Matthew Owen Gribble (March 28, 1962 – March 21, 2004) was an American competition swimmer, world champion, and world record-holder.

Born in Houston, Texas, Gribble broke the world record in the 100-meter butterfly in 1983.  He attended the University of Miami, where he swam for the Miami Hurricanes swimming and diving team in National Collegiate Athletic Association (NCAA) competition.  While swimming for the Hurricanes, he won two NCAA titles, two gold medals in the 1982 World Aquatics Championships in Ecuador, and three gold medals at the 1983 Pan American Games.  He was a member of the U.S. Olympic teams in 1980 and 1984.

On March 21, 2004, at age 41, Gribble died in a head-on automobile accident in Miami.  He is buried at Caballero Rivero Woodlawn North Park Cemetery and Mausoleum in Miami.

See also
 List of World Aquatics Championships medalists in swimming (men)
 World record progression 100 metres butterfly
 World record progression 4 × 100 metres medley relay

References
 Matt Gribble obituary, Boston Globe, March 29, 2004.
 Blog of Death website article.
 

1962 births
2004 deaths
American male butterfly swimmers
American male freestyle swimmers
World record setters in swimming
Miami Hurricanes men's swimmers
Olympic swimmers of the United States
Sportspeople from Houston
Road incident deaths in Florida
Swimmers at the 1983 Pan American Games
Swimmers at the 1984 Summer Olympics
World Aquatics Championships medalists in swimming
Pan American Games gold medalists for the United States
Pan American Games medalists in swimming
Medalists at the 1983 Pan American Games
20th-century American people
21st-century American people